A Jupiter-crosser is a minor planet whose orbit crosses that of Jupiter. Jupiter trojans can be inner grazers (105), outer grazers (52), co-orbitals (183), and crossers (537). Discounting them, there is one numbered, 7 non-numbered, and 19 cometary outer-grazers. For the Jupiter trojans, see List of Jupiter trojans (Greek camp) and List of Jupiter trojans (Trojan camp).

Members

Inner grazers

The following is a list of named asteroids that are not Jupiter trojans with a<4.950429, 4.950429<Q<5.458104.

Outer grazers
Similar to inner grazers, these orbit with a semi-major axis greater than Jupiter, but still have a perihelion distance within Jupiter's perihelion and aphelion, a>5.458104 and 4.950429<q<5.458104.

Jupiter crossers
These are asteroids that cross the orbit of Jupiter in any sort of way, defined simply as having a perihelion less than that of Jupiter's perihelion, and an aphelion greater than Jupiter's aphelion.

Jupiter Crossers

The numbered Jupiter-crossers are (incomplete):

Note: † denotes inner-grazer (aphelia outside Jupiter's perihelion and within its aphelion) (from )

 944 Hidalgo 
 1941 Wild †
 2483 Guinevere †
 2959 Scholl †
 3415 Danby †
 3552 Don Quixote
 4446 Carolyn †
 5164 Mullo
 5335 Damocles
 5370 Taranis † (2:1 resonance)
 6144 Kondojiro
 8373 Stephengould †
 8550 Hesiodos †
 9767 Midsomer Norton †
 10608 Mameta †
  †
 12896 Geoffroy †
  †
 15231 Ehdita †
 15376 Marták †
 
  †
  †
 
  †
  †
 20461 Dioretsa
  †
 20898 Fountainhills
 21804 Václavneumann †
  †
  †
 22647 Levi-Strauss †
  †
  †
  †
  †
  †
 
 37117 Narcissus
  †
  †
  †
  †
  †
  †
  †
  †
  †
  †
  †
  †
  †
  †
  †
 
  †
  †
  †
  †
  †
  †
  †
  †
  †
 84011 Jean-Claude †
  †
  †
  †
  †
 99862 Kenlevin †
  †

See also
 List of Mercury-crossing minor planets
 List of Venus-crossing minor planets
 List of Earth-crossing minor planets
 List of Mars-crossing minor planets
 List of Saturn-crossing minor planets
 List of Uranus-crossing minor planets
 List of Neptune-crossing minor planets

References

Jupiter-crossing
Jupiter
Minor planet
 
Jupiter-crossing minor planets